Owais Husain (born 1967) is a multi-media artist, painter and filmmaker.

Biography 

Owais Husain was born in Mumbai, India, in 1967. The son of M. F. Husain and Fazila, he has two sisters, Raisa and Aqueela, and two brothers, Mustafa and Shamshad.

Husain graduated in Fine Arts from the Sir Jamsetjee Jeejebhoy School of Art in 1990. He currently resides and works in Dubai and Mumbai.

Work 

Owais Husain is a multi-media artist whose works have been shown in both group exhibitions and solo shows. He has also worked as a Producer, Director and Writer for film and music.

International multi-media artist. 

As an artist who has been active since the late 80s, he has explored numerous mediums through study and his produced pieces. Husain has used a range of mediums, including: poetry, painting, watercolor and sculpture, in his varied works.

Most recently, he has combined multiple mediums into installations and more diversely textured works.

Husain is an international artist, having studied in Mumbai and Bhopal in India, and New York, USA. His works have been shown in art capitals around the world, such as London, New Delhi, New York, and Dubai. Husain’s recent works have been shown at the Institute of Contemporary Arts Singapore and in PUBLICA 2016, an outdoor sculpture exhibition in New Delhi organised by the Floodlight Foundation.

Themes of identity, iconography and mythology.

Owais Husain is known as an Indian contemporary artist. His works explore a range of themes, namely: iconography, urban mythology, identity and culture. Many of his works have been influenced by his Indian heritage, from traditional form and subjects, yet equally his work is differentiated and not wholly based on traditional Indian art.

Solo exhibitions 

2016	Owais Husain: House of Cards. A Collaboration with the students of the LASALLE College of the Arts, Faculties of Fine Arts and Media Arts, Institute of Contemporary Arts Singapore, Praxis Space and Project Space

2015 	Heart of Silence, Capsule Arts, Dubai

2014 	My Body, A Fleet of Ships, W. Foundation, Seoul

2013 	Forest of Lost Languages, Burj Khalifa, Dubai

2010 	3 Worlds, Tao Art Gallery, Mumbai

2006 	Forest of Lost Languages, Aicon Gallery, New York

2000 	Owais Husain: New Works, Gallery 88, Calcutta

1998 	The Present is the Source of Presences, Vadehra Art Gallery, New Delhi

1997 	The Present is the Source of Presences, Sakshi Art Gallery, Mumbai

1995 	Owais Husain: Recent Works, Sakshi Art Gallery, Mumbai

1994 	Owais Husain: Paintings and Drawings, Vadehra Art Gallery, New Delhi

1992 	Cities and Sky, Centre for Environmental Planning and Technology Campus, Ahmedabad (Winning exhibit)

1989 	That Obscure Object of Desire, Triveni Gallery, New Delhi

1987 	Photographic installation on North/Central India, Festival of India in Moscow and St Petersburg

1986 	The Sea that Found a Tree, Site specific installation, Sir J.J. School of Art, Mumbai

Group exhibitions 

2016 	PUBLICA 2016, outdoor public sculpture installations sponsored by the Floodlight Foundation, New Delhi

2011	Contemporary Art, Dunia Media City Financial Centre, Dubai

2010	Owais/Tassaduq, Unicorn Gallery, Karachi

2008 	Keep Drawing, Gallery Espace, New Delhi

2007 	Double Take, Gallery Espace, New Delhi, Indian Art III/III, curated by Nancy Adajania, Vadehra Grosvenor Gallery, London

2004	Husain & Sons, Aicon Gallery, New York

2003	A Celebration of Colour, organized by Vadhera Gallery, Jehangir Art Gallery, Mumbai

2001	Century City, curated by Geeta Kapur and Ashish Rajadhyaksha, Tate Modern, London, Excerpts from My Diary Pages, The Fine Art Company, Mumbai

2000	Erotica, The Fine Art Company, Mumbai

1999	Wallpaper, Kala-Ghoda Festival, Kala-Goda pavements, Mumbai

Legatee: Exhibition of The JJ School Alumni, Fine Art Company, Mumbai

Icons, organized by Lakeeren Gallery, Sir JJ School of Applied Arts, Mumbai

Contemporary Indian Artists Today, organized by Vadehra Art Gallery, Jehangir Art Gallery, Mumbai

1998	Wilberding Collection of Contemporary Indian Art, National Gallery of Modern Art, Mumbai

Generations: Indian Contemporary Art from Jamini Roy to the Present, A Gallery, New York

1997	Indian Contemporary Art – Post Independence, organized by Vadehra Art Gallery, National Gallery of Modern Art, New Delhi

A Gift for India, organized by SAHMAT, LKA Galleries, Rabindra Bhavan, New Delhi

The Looking Glass Self, Lakeeren Gallery, Mumbai

1996	Cinema Scape: An Artist’s Tribute to 100 Years of Cinema, Lakeeren Art Gallery, Mumbai

1995	A Tree in my Life, organized by The Village Art Gallery, Academy of Fine Arts and Literature, New Delhi

1993	Four Young Contemporaries, curated by Rekha Rodwittya, Cymroza Art Gallery, Mumbai, and  Sakshi Art Gallery, Bangelore

Projects, film and music 

2016	House of Cards, a three-day workshop with the International Institute of Fine Arts, Modi Nagar, India

2015	House of Cards, a three-day workshop and collaborative sculpture project with LASALLE College of the Arts, Singapore

A Paper House For My Vocabulary, collaborative light and paper installation with 250 school children, King’s School, Dubai

2010	Producer and Director, Letters to My Son About My Father, (16 mins) Documentary on the life and times of M.F.Husain, draft version screened at the Tribeca International Film Festival, Doha (2010), and the Victoria & Albert Museum, London (2014)

2009	Producer, Flight, experimental music track, (6 mins), The Festival of Thinkers, Abu Dhabi

2007	Director, Ek Mohabbat, (5 mins) short film on an anthem by A.R.Rahman, Seven Wonders of The World International Campaign (Winner)

2004	Writer and co-director, Meenaxi: Tale of 3 Cities, (130 mins, Hindi) (National Award Winner, India), score and soundtrack by A.R. Rahman, screened at the Melbourne International Film Festival and Filmfest Düsseldorf (2004)

2000	Associate Director, Gaja Gamini, (122 mins, Hindi), screened at the London International Film Festival (2000), Berlin Film Biennale (2001), and Marché du Film section, Cannes Film Festival (2004)

References 

https://www.outlookindia.com/magazine/story/owais-husain/266765 - 2. Outlook Magazine

Further reading
 The Tribune
 The Indian Express
 The National
 The National
 News 18
 Outlook
 Daily News and Analysis
 The Daily Star
 Vogue India
 Daily News and Analysis

Indian performance artists
1967 births
Living people
Artists from Mumbai